Ostroh may refer to:

 Ostroh, a historic city in Rivne Oblast, Ukraine
 Uherský Ostroh, a town in Zlín Region, Czech Republic
 Ostroh Raion, a former raion of Rivne Oblast, Ukraine
 National University of Ostroh Academy, an autonomous research university in Ukraine
 Ostroh Castle, a castle in Ostroh, Ukraine
 Ostroh Academy, a former academy in Ostróg, Polish–Lithuanian Commonwealth

See also
 Ostrog (disambiguation)